Parapachyacris taiwanensis is a species of grasshopper in the family Acrididae found in Taiwan, and the sole member of the genus Parapachyacris.

Description

As of 2008, only the female of the species has been described. The rear leg is yellowish-brown with yellow banding.

References

Acrididae
Monotypic Orthoptera genera